Auburn Tunnel was a 19th-century canal tunnel built for the Schuylkill Canal near Auburn, Pennsylvania. It was the first transportation tunnel in the United States.

The tunnel was deliberately added to the canal as a novelty, as the hill it was bored though could have easily been bypassed. It became a major attraction, with people traveling over  upriver from Philadelphia to see it.  It was periodically shortened, and in 1857 was daylighted to become an open-cut.

See also 
 Montgomery Bell Tunnel – a slightly earlier aqueduct tunnel in the United States
 Staple Bend Tunnel – the first railroad tunnel in the United States

References 

Canals in Pennsylvania
Transportation buildings and structures in Schuylkill County, Pennsylvania
Tunnels in Pennsylvania
Schuylkill River
Tunnels completed in 1821
Canal tunnels in the United States
Water transportation in Pennsylvania
1821 establishments in Pennsylvania